Sintanjin station is a railway station on the Gyeongbu Line in South Korea.

Railway stations in Daejeon